The 8G is a Soviet-built electric locomotive used in China. It is developed and built by Novocherkassk Electric Locomotive Plant. The design of 8G is based on Soviet Railway VL80S electric locomotives. It is a kind of locomotive with Bo′Bo′+Bo′Bo′ wheel arrangement used in China.

8G Electric Locomotive is an eight shaft fixing reconnection heavy freight electric locomotive that is based on two four-axle locomotives connected.

Preservation
 8G-002: is preserved at the China Railway Museum
 8G-076: is preserved at Taiyuan Locomotive Depot, Taiyuan Railway Bureau

See also 
 VL80
 China Railways 8K
 China Railways SS4

References 

Bo′Bo′+Bo′Bo′ locomotives
8G
25 kV AC locomotives
Railway locomotives introduced in 1987
Standard gauge locomotives of China